Kilian Feldbausch (born 7 September 2005) is a Swiss tennis player. He has a career-high ATP doubles ranking of world No. 1961, achieved on 18 October 2021. He featured in a professional tennis tournament in Biel, Switzerland in March 2021, at age 15.

He is the son of former tennis player Cathy Caverzasio.

Tennis career

2022
Feldbausch became the first Swiss player since Roger Federer in 1998 to reach the semi-finals of the junior Australian Open. He also reached the semifinals of the doubles, partnering Gabriel Debru.
Kilian Feldbausch won his first 3 ATP points after reaching the semi finals of the M25 Futures in Trimbach, Switzerland. 

He further reached the round of 16 at the Challenger Biel/Bienne, after beating the 7th seed Marc-Andrea Hüsler in the first round in straight sets, 7-5 6-0. He then lost 7-6 7-6 in the second round to Filip Horansky.

References 

2005 births
Living people
Tennis players from Geneva
Swiss male tennis players